Armand-Jacques Leroy de Saint-Arnaud (20 August 1798 – 29 September 1854) was a French soldier and Marshal of France. He served as French Minister of War until the Crimean War when he became Commander-in-chief of the army of the East.

Biography
Born in Paris, he entered the army in 1817, but after ten years of garrison service he still held only the lowest commissioned grade. He then resigned, led a life of adventure in several lands and returned to the army at the age of thirty as a sub-lieutenant. However, his debts and the scandals of his private life compelled him to go to Algeria as a captain in the French Foreign Legion. There he distinguished himself on numerous occasions, and after twelve years had risen to the rank of maréchal de camp (major general).

Following the example of Marshal Aimable Pélissier, Saint Arnaud suffocated 500 Arab tribesmen (8 August 1845), in a cave between Tenes and Mostaganem, in the Sbeah area. Three days later he wrote "I hermetically sealed all exits and made a vast cemetery. The earth will cover the corpses of these fanatics for ever. No one went down to the caverns; no one but me knows that there are 500 brigands under here who will not cut the throats of the French any more. A confidential report related everything to the Marshal simply, without terrible poetry and without images. Brother, no one is good by taste and by nature like me. From the 8th to the 12th, I was sick, but my conscience does not blame me for anything. I did my duty" . These massacres were regarded with absolute horror in the French press, as an article in The Times relates.

He also burnt 200 villages in 1846, including rich arable fields."I left in my wake a vast conflagration. All the villages, some 200 in number, were burned down, all the gardens destroyed, all the olive trees cut down."

In 1848 Saint Arnaud commanded a brigade during the revolution in Paris. On his return to Africa, possibly because Louis Napoleon considered him a suitable  military head of a potential coup d'état, an expedition took place into Little Kabylie in northern Algeria, in which Saint Arnaud showed his prowess as a commander-in-chief and provided his superiors with the pretext for bringing him home as a general of division (July 1851).

He succeeded Marshal Magnan as minister of war and superintended the military operations of the coup d'état of 2 December 1851, which placed Louis Napoleon on the throne as Emperor Napoleon III. A year later he became a Marshal of France and a senator, remaining at the head of the war office till 1854, when he set out to command the French forces in the Crimean War, alongside his British colleague Lord Raglan. Ill with stomach cancer, he died on board ship just over a week after commanding troops at the Battle of the Alma on 20 September 1854. His body, returned to France, lies buried in Les Invalides.

After his death Saint Arnaud was regarded as a military hero, by both the French state and army. However, in Victor Hugo's long poem "Saint Arnaud", he is described as a criminal ‘jackal’ who had orchestrated the bloody massacres that followed Louis-Napoleon’s coup d’état. Algernon Charles Swinburne later described the poem of Saint Arnaud as an example of Hugo's 'poetic genius'. Swinburne said 'Then... came the great and terrible poem on the life and death of the miscreant marshal who gave the watchword of massacre in the streets of Paris'.

Legacy
The town of St Arnaud, Victoria, Australia  was named after Jacques and has a commemorative statue of him in the town's botanical gardens on Napier Street. Another town, located in Algeria, was called Saint Arnaud under French rule; currently, its name is El Eulma. The Saint Arnaud Range and the nearby locality of Saint Arnaud in New Zealand both derive their name from him.

Honours 
 : Baton of Maréchal de France
 : Grand Croix of the Legion of Honour   
 : Médaille militaire
 : Grand Croix of the Order of Saints Maurice and Lazarus
 : Grand Croix of the Order of Saint George and Reunion
 : Grand Croix of the Order of Pope Pius IX
 : Grand Croix of the Order of St. Gregory the Great
 : Commander of the Order of Leopold
 : First Class of the Order of the Medjidie
 : First Class of the Order of Glory

Further reading
Lettres du Maréchal de Saint Arnaud (Paris, 1855; 2nd edition with memoire by Sainte-Beuve, 1858).

References

 
 

1801 births
1854 deaths
Politicians from Paris
Bonapartists
French Ministers of War
People of the French Second Republic
French Senators of the Second Empire
Marshals of France
French military personnel of the Crimean War
Grand Croix of the Légion d'honneur
Officers of the French Foreign Legion
Knights Grand Cross of the Order of Saints Maurice and Lazarus
Knights Grand Cross of the Order of St Gregory the Great
People who died at sea